Las Cruces High School is a public high school in Las Cruces, New Mexico, United States. LCHS was established in 1918 and is the oldest public high school in Las Cruces. As of the 2021-22 school year, it serves 1,830 students from grades 9–12. It is a part of Las Cruces Public Schools.

History
The former Las Cruces High School is located at the corner of Alameda and Picacho Avenues near downtown Las Cruces and Holy Cross Catholic Church. The current campus (opened in 1954) inherited the Bulldog mascot and school colors from the former school, which served as a unified high school for the several smaller school districts that existed in the area before being consolidated to form LCPS. After the opening of the current campus, the old LCHS building was converted to Alameda Junior High School. AJHS itself closed its doors in the early 1980s and the old building sat vacant for several years. The building is now part of the Third Judicial District Court in Las Cruces.

The current campus has undergone numerous renovations and expansions since opening its doors in 1956. Among the more recent additions to the campus a vocational arts building was constructed in 1993, a new classroom wing and central hallway ("D" wing) were built in 1997, the music wing was renovated and a new band facility added between 1996 and 1998, the cafeteria was renovated and a commons area added in 2000, and another new classroom wing opened in 2002. Beginning in the summer of 2013, the campus underwent an extensive three-phase renovation, with a proposed budget of $84 million USD. The gym lobby is dedicated to Our Lady of Sorrows, and St. Genevieve is the patron saint of Las Cruces High School.

El Paseo campus renovations 
A multi-phase construction program was proposed to renovate the school. The contract was awarded to Wooten-Sundt joint construction venture, and construction for Phase I broke ground in 2014.

Rivalry

LCHS has a long-standing rivalry with Mayfield, the city's second-oldest public high school, with the annual football clash between the schools routinely attracting more than 20,000 fans. LCHS and MHS have combined to win 11 of the past 20 New Mexico state championships in football, with the annual year-end game between the schools almost invariably determining the district title. The Mayfield-Las Cruces high school football rivalry was voted the 9th best in the nation by rivals.com in 2008. The documentary film Cruces Divided is based on this rivalry.

Athletics
LCHS competes in the New Mexico Activities Association (NMAA), as a class 6A school in District 3. In 2014, NMAA realigned the state's schools in to six classifications and adjusted district boundaries.  In addition to Las Cruces High School, the schools in District 3-6A include: Oñate High School, Mayfield High School, Gadsden High School, Hobbs High School, and Carlsbad High School (New Mexico). From its opening until the opening of the Pan American Center, the New Mexico State Aggies men's basketball team played its home games at the LCHS gym, and the West first round games of the 1959 NCAA University Division basketball tournament were held there, one of only two high school gymnasiums to host games of the tournament (the other being Capitol Hill High School in Oklahoma City).

State championships

(*) Las Cruces Union High School

(†) Not officially recognized by NMAA, which does not recognize any state football titles before 1950.

Notable alumni
 Rich Beem, professional golfer, 2002 PGA Champion
 Joseph Benavidez, UFC flyweight fighter
 Sharon Douglas, actress
 Chuck Franco, First Gentleman of New Mexico since 2011
 Jerry Hinsley, former professional baseball player in Major League Baseball
 David Krummenacker, professional track athlete
 Taylor Lytle, professional soccer player in the National Women's Soccer League
 Benjamin Alire Sáenz, author
 Letticia Martinez, Paralympic swimmer
 Vendula Strnadová, professional soccer player

References

Educational institutions established in 1954
Public high schools in New Mexico
Buildings and structures in Las Cruces, New Mexico
Schools in Doña Ana County, New Mexico
1954 establishments in New Mexico